California Star is the 2012 album from Martin Stephenson and the Daintees.

Track listing
All songs written and arranged by Martin Stephenson, except track 11 written by Helen McCookerybook.
 'The Ship' - 04:42
 'The Streets Of San Sebastian' - 04:24
 'Power That Is Greater' - 02:45
 'California Star' - 03:24
 'Ready To Move On' - 03:11
 'Boy To Man' - 03:43
 'Something Special' - 03:40
 'Silverbird' - 04:29
 'Long Way To Go' - 03:31
 'Sweet Cherwine' - 02:17
 'I'm In Love For The First Time' - 03:41

Personnel
Martin Stephenson – Lead Vocals, Guitars
John Steel - Guitars, Keyboards
Kate Stephenson – Drums
Helen McCookerybook - Backing Vocals
Ally Macleod - Backing Vocals
Jill Hepburn - Backing Vocals
Stevie Smith - Harmonica
Kenny Brady - Fiddle, Mandolin

References

2012 albums
Martin Stephenson and the Daintees albums